Pipirig is a commune in Neamț County, Western Moldavia, Romania. It is composed of seven villages: Boboiești, Dolhești, Leghin, Pâțâligeni, Pipirig, Pluton, and Stânca.

Natives
Nicodim, born Nicolae Munteanu (1864–1948), Patriarch of All Romania.

References

Communes in Neamț County
Localities in Western Moldavia